Say Blow by Blow Backwards is the second and last album by Fred Wesley and the Horny Horns featuring Maceo Parker. The album was released in August 1979 by Atlantic Records and was produced by George Clinton, Bootsy Collins and Fred Wesley.

The album was reissued in 1993, first by P-Vine records in Japan, then by Sequel Records in the UK, and lastly AEM in the U.S. The CD reissue contains remixes of "Half a Man" and "Say Blow by Blow Backwards" as well as an interview with Bootsy Collins.

Track listing
"We Came to Funk Ya" (Bootsy Collins)
"Half a Man" (Billy Bass Nelson, George Clinton)
"Say Blow by Blow Backwards" (Fred Wesley)
"Mr. Melody Man" (Ron Dunbar)
"Just Like You" (George Clinton, Garry Shider)
"Circular Motion" (Fred Wesley)

Bonus tracks on the CD reissue
"Half a Man" (New Remix)
"Say Blow by Blow Backwards" (New Remix)
Interview (with Bootsy Collins)

Personnel
Bootsy Collins, Phelps Collins, Garry Shider, Rodney Crutcher, Michael Hampton - guitar
Bootsy Collins, Donnie Sterling, Billy Bass Nelson, Cordell Mosson, Rodney Curtis - bass
Bootsy Collins, Gary "Mudbone" Cooper, Frank Waddy, Tyrone Lampkin, Jerome Brailey, Jesse Williams - drums
Bernie Worrell, Joel Johnson, Jerome Rogers, Maceo Parker, Fred Wesley - keyboards
Fred Wesley, Maceo Parker, Rick Gardner, Richard Griffith - horns
Carl "Butch" Small, Larry Fratangelo - percussion
Gary "Mudbone" Cooper, Jessica Cleaves, Dawn Silva, Jeanette McGruder, Sheila Horne, Robert "P-Nut" Johnson, George Clinton - backing vocals
Technical
Ronald P."Stozo" Edwards - cover illustration

References

The Horny Horns albums
1979 albums
Atlantic Records albums
P-Vine Records albums